HuntBar, aka WinTools or Adware.Websearch, was installed by an ActiveX drive-by download at affiliate Web sites, or by advertisements displayed by other spyware programs — an example of how spyware can install more spyware. These programs add toolbars to Internet Explorer, track aggregate browsing behavior, redirect affiliate references, and display advertisements.

HuntBar spyware information
This is a hijacker application. Hijackers take control of your web browser's settings, and usually change your homepage, search page or other default pages to point to web sites owned by the hijacker. Since the hijackers can make money based on the number of visits to their web sites, they benefit from forcing you to view their web sites each time your web browser opens.

Hijackers don't normally damage your computer or steal your personal information.

 Size: 1,532,928 bytes
 Threat level: Low
 Author: First Cash Reserve, LLC
 Appeared: Variants from April, 2003 to February, 2004
 Detections: 6,803,305

References

Spyware